The Sovietsky Hotel is a historic Soviet-styled hotel built in 1952 and located in Moscow on Leningradsky Prospect.

History
Sovietsky was built on Stalin's orders and opened in 1952. The architecture is based on Russian traditionalism and Soviet era styles. Yar, founded in 1826, one of the highest rated restaurants in Russia at the time, is located in Sovietsky Hotel after the hotel opened.

The hotel was often used to accommodate foreign diplomats and contains numerous hidden rooms used for spying.

In 2006, there were plans to rebrand the hotel as Ivanka Hotel after Ivanka Trump.

References

External links 
 
 Photos of Hotel Sovietsky

Hotels in Moscow
Hotels built in the Soviet Union
Stalinist architecture
Hotels established in 1952
Hotel buildings completed in 1952
1952 establishments in the Soviet Union
Cultural heritage monuments of regional significance in Moscow